Sami Hautamäki is a Finnish sport shooter who took silver in the Standard division behind Håvard Østgaard at the 2017 IPSC Rifle World Shoot, and silver in the Modified division behind Teemu Rintala at the 2018 IPSC Shotgun World Shoot. In 2015 he became the European IPSC Rifle Championship winner in the Standard division. He also has five podium finishes at the IPSC Nordic Rifle Championships, with four of them being gold.

See also 
 Raine Peltokoski, Finnish sport shooter
 Josh Froelich, American sport shooter
 Michal Vavrečka, Czech sport shooter

References 

IPSC shooters
Finnish male sport shooters
Living people
Year of birth missing (living people)